Sanguinograptis ochrolegnia is a species of moth of the family Tortricidae. It is found in Cameroon and Nigeria.

The wingspan is about 12 mm. The forewings are dark leaden-grey with a slight bluish shade. The costa, termen and an oblique fascia from the costa to the tornus are all orange marked with small leaden grey spots. There are three elongate red markings extending from the dorsum, followed by three red rounded spots in the subcostal area. The hindwings are blackish brown.

References

Moths described in 1986
Tortricini